Walter Bohne (9 January 1903 – 5 January 1944) was a German communist and resistance fighter against Nazism.

Biography
Bohne was born in Burg bei Magdeburg. A shipbuilder by profession, he joined the Young Communist League of Germany (KJVD) in 1921 and the Communist Party of Germany (KPD) shortly afterwards. He moved to Hamburg in 1928 and was active in the Red Sport International. In 1934 he was arrested and sentenced to two years' imprisonment.

After his release, Bohne organized a group of communist athletes from 1939 and joined the Bästlein-Jacob-Abshagen Group, an anti-Nazi resistance group, in 1941. He was arrested and imprisoned again in 1942, but managed to escape after the bombing of Hamburg in July 1943. On 5 January 1944, three Gestapo officers tried to arrest Bohne in Hamburg; when trying to defend himself, he was shot to death.

References

1903 births
1944 deaths
People from Burg bei Magdeburg
Communist Party of Germany politicians
Communists in the German Resistance
People executed by Nazi Germany by firearm
Resistance members killed by Nazi Germany